This is a list of ports and harbours in São Tomé and Príncipe.

Major and minor ports

Príncipe and the surrounding islets
Port of Santo António - the island's chief port, small pier

São Tomé and the surrounding islets
Ana Chaves Bay (São Tomé), the country's major port, quays
Neves, oil terminal
Fernão Dias, small concrete pier

References

Sao Tome and Principe
Sao Tome Principe